Cristo Rey Polytechnic Institute is a private Catholic primary, secondary, and vocational training college, located in Valladolid, in the Castile and León region of Spain. Founded by the Society of Jesus in 1939 in the wake of the Spanish Civil War, the school began as a technical school, and then grew to include infant, primary, secondary, baccalaureate, PCPI, and CF of middle and superior degree.

History 
On the occasion of the institute's 75th anniversary in 2015, the Minister of Education of Castile and León praised the contribution that the Institute has made to education in the region, which experienced a job-surge after its opening. The institute has ties with over 300 companies. Over 90% of students who did a practicum with Renault were hired by the company. An open house at the school was attended by the Minister of Economy, the General Director of Labor, and the General Director of Vocational Training as well as by employers' organizations of Concerted Teaching and the secretary of The Federation of Education and Management.

See also

 Catholic Church in Spain
 Education in Spain
 List of Jesuit schools

References  

Vocational education in Spain
Education in Castile and León
Jesuit secondary schools in Spain
Buildings and structures in Valladolid
Educational institutions established in 1939
1939 establishments in Spain